Javier Ruibal (full name Francisco Javier Ruibal de Flores Calero) (born May 15, 1955) is a Spanish musician and songwriter.

Biography

Javier Ruibal was born in El Puerto de Santa María, in the province of Cadiz in southern Spain. His first album, called Duna, was released in 1983. He is highly regarded for his vocal talent and for blending the musical traditions of flamenco, jazz, and the Maghreb to develop his own personal style.

He plays the guitar and is usually accompanied by another guitar player, first Antonio Toledo and since around 2000 Tito Alcedo, and occasionally by more musicians such as John Parsons, Jorge Pardo and Chano Domínguez. He has ventured beyond Spain to appear at venues in Algeria, England, the West Bank, and New York City.

Ruibal has composed music for several other Spanish artists and famous singers; some, such as Ana Belén or David Broza, have sung his compositions.

In 2007, he was awarded the Medal of Andalusia by the autonomous government of Andalusia. In 2009, he was chosen to give the opening address of the Cadix Carnaval celebration. In 2020, Javier Ruibal's song Intemperie was awarded the prize for the best original song (in the movie Intemperie by Benito Zambrano) at the Goya Awards, sometimes dubbed the "Spanish Oscars".

Works
 Duna (1983, Hispavox)
 Cuerpo Celeste (1986, Ariola)
 La Piel De Sara (1989, Ariola)
 Pensión Triana (1994, Lollipop)
 Contrabando (1997, PDI)
 Las Damas Primero (2001, 18 Chulos)
 Sáhara (2003, World Music Network)
 Lo Que Me Dice Tu Boca (2005, 18 Chulos)
 Pensión Triana – Special Edition (2010, 18 Chulos)
 Sueño (2011, 18 Chulos)
 Quedate Conmigo (2013, Lo Suyo)
 35 aniversario (2016, Lo Suyo)
 Paraísos Mejores (2018, Lo Suyo)

References

External links
 

1955 births
Living people
Musicians from Andalusia
Singers from Andalusia
Spanish singer-songwriters
People from El Puerto de Santa María
Spanish guitarists
Spanish flamenco guitarists
Spanish male guitarists
Gypsy jazz guitarists
Spanish male singers
Flamenco guitarists
Male jazz musicians